is a train station in the city of Nisshin, Aichi Prefecture, Japan, operated by Meitetsu.

Lines

Station layout
The station has two elevated opposed side platforms with the station building underneath. The station has automated ticket machines, Manaca automated turnstiles and is staffed.

Platforms

Adjacent stations

|-
!colspan=5|Nagoya Railroad

Station history
Nisshin Station was opened on July 29, 1979.

Passenger statistics
In fiscal 2017, the station was used by an average of 10,323 passengers daily.

Surrounding area
Nishsin City Hall
Nisshin Orido Hospital

See also
 List of Railway Stations in Japan

References

External links

 Official web page 

Railway stations in Japan opened in 1979
Railway stations in Aichi Prefecture
Stations of Nagoya Railroad
Nisshin, Aichi